Sredoseltsi is a village in northeastern Bulgaria, part of Isperih Municipality and situated in the central part of the Ludogorie region. 

365 inhabitants reside in Sredoseltsi.

Sredoseltsi has an area of 6,778 km2. Its neighbors include Kapinovtsi to the south, and Pechenitsa to the north-east.

External links
Photo albums with images of the village

References

Villages in Razgrad Province